César Madalngué (born 9 December 1987) is a Chadian football defender and the member of Chad national football team. He has 14 caps for national team, and he was a part of qualifying campaign for 2010 World Cup.

Club career
Madalngué started his career in Renaissance FC, after he went to Gazelle FC, where he won two Chad Premier League titles, in 2009 and 2012. From 2013, he played for AS CotonTchad, only to finalize his career with one extra year in Gazelle.

International career
Madalngué debuted in a friendly match against Benin in 2007. Soon after that, he played on 2007 CEMAC Cup, where he played all 4 games (2 games against Central African Republic, Gabon and Cameroon). Also, he played 2 games against South Africa (0-3 and 0-4  losses) and 2 ACN 2008 qualification matches against Zambia  and Congo. His next 2 games came in 2010 FIFA World Cup qualification, against Congo and Sudan. In 2010, he played friendly match against Niger, and 2012 Africa Cup of Nations qualification match against Botswana.  In 2011, he played against Malawi in N'Djamena, and in 2012 against Malawi in 3-2 win. That is 14 matches in total, as Cameroon match in CEMAC 2007 is not considered official.

See also
 List of Chad international footballers

References

External links

1987 births
Living people
Chadian footballers
Chad international footballers
Renaissance FC players
Gazelle FC players
AS CotonTchad players
Association football fullbacks